The commune of Butihinda is a commune of Muyinga Province in northeastern Burundi. The capital lies at Butihinda.

References

Communes of Burundi
Muyinga Province